Boone Bridge may refer to any of the following bridges in the United States:

 Boone Bridge (Boone, Iowa), a former bridge over the Des Moines River southwest of Boone
 Boone Bridge (Oregon), a highway bridge over the Willamette River at Wilsonville, Oregon, United States.
 Boone Bridge 2, a bridge spanning the Des Moines River west of Boone, Iowa
 Boone River Bridge, a historic structure north of Goldfield, Iowa
 Daniel Boone Bridge, two highway bridges across the Missouri River in Missouri